Elections for the Third German People's Congress were held in East Germany on 15 and 16 May 1949. Voters were presented with a "Unity List" from the "Bloc of the Anti-Fascist Democratic Parties," which was dominated by the Communist-leaning Socialist Unity Party of Germany (SED). The ballot was worded "I am for the unity of Germany and a just peace treaty. I therefore vote for the following list of candidates for the Third German People's Congress," with voters having the options of voting "yes" and "no". In much of the country, the vote was not secret.

According to official figures, 95.2% of voters voted, and 66% of them approved the list, the lowest vote share an SED-dominated bloc received during the subsequent four decades of Communist rule. In all subsequent elections until the Peaceful Revolution, the National Front, successor to the Democratic Bloc, would win 99 percent or more of the vote.

Results

Aftermath
The Constitutional Assembly adopted East Germany's first constitution in October, and proclaimed the establishment of the German Democratic Republic on 7 October. It then transformed itself into the first Volkskammer.

References

East German
Constitutional Assembly election
Elections in East Germany
Single-candidate elections
East Germany
Aftermath of World War II in Germany
German reunification
East Germany